Isaac Oliver (born in Baltimore, Maryland) is an author, playwright and on-stage comic known for his debut humor collection.

Early life and education 
Oliver studied playwriting at Sarah Lawrence College and graduated from the Carver Center for Arts and Technology, which he later called "a magical place, a haven for weird, expressive kids who like to sob in stairwells." He was a 2013 McDowell Colony fellow.

Career 
After college, Oliver moved to Manhattan, worked at a theatre box office and started a blog about his daily life, ultimately performing material from the blog for his friends. He then performed live at midtown theatre Ars Nova's variety-show gala "Showgasm." New York magazine called Oliver "a monstrous new talent." He has written for HBO's "High Maintenance", Netflix's "GLOW," Amazon's "The Marvelous Mrs. Maisel," and has frequently contributed to The New York Times.

After the release of Oliver's book Intimacy Idiot, writer Sarah Larson wrote in The New Yorker that actor Jonathan Groff, to practice each day for the play "Hamilton," read a page from Intimacy Idiot in a King George accent.

In 2017, Oliver began performing in residence at Joe's Pub in The Public Theatre, in a show titled "Isaac Oliver Sits Down" and directed by Jason Eagan.

In December 2017, he premiered a holiday special, "Isaac Oliver's Lonely Christmas," on the West Coast at the Diversionary Theatre in San Diego.

Book 
Oliver's book, Intimacy Idiot, released by Scribner in June 2015, is a collection of essays about dating, living, working, and being single in New York City, about which Kirkus Reviews Features, in an interview with the author, wrote, "The material breathes with sharp honesty and boasts an assured authorial voice... ."

NPR named Intimacy Idiot one of its Best Books of 2015.

Stephan Lee in a book review for Entertainment Weekly, wrote, "Like any young memoirist worth reading, Oliver has mastered the art of self-deprecation." Kirkus Reviews, in its review, described Oliver's writing as "in-your-face funny but with surprisingly moving moments," while Publishers Weekly wrote, "His chatty style and candor about sex is entertaining."

In a feature article about Oliver, Metro, an international daily newspaper, called his book "a collection of essays, vignettes, poems, lists and diary entries that document the poignant, hilarious and awkward moments of intimacy between humans."

Awards 
In 2020, Oliver was nominated for a Writers Guild Award for his episode "Trick" from the fourth season of "High Maintenance." In 2011, Oliver took home a New York Innovative Theatre Award for Outstanding Original Short Script for his short play Come Here.

Personal life 
Oliver, who is homosexual, has said, "I'm very proud to be gay. I'm very thankful to be gay. If it were a choice, I'd choose it."

References

External links 
 Official site
 Publisher's Intimacy Idiot page

Living people
American humorists
Writers from Baltimore
Writers from New York City
American comedy writers
Fordham University alumni
Sarah Lawrence College alumni
American gay writers
American male dramatists and playwrights
21st-century American dramatists and playwrights
Gay comedians
LGBT people from Maryland
21st-century American essayists
American male essayists
Year of birth missing (living people)
21st-century American male writers
American LGBT comedians